Lamassa Island is an island in Lamassa Bay off the village of Lamassa off the south-western coast of New Ireland, Papua New Guinea. It contains Lamassa Airport and a village on the north coast.

References

Islands of Papua New Guinea
New Ireland Province